"Little Devil" is a song written by Neil Sedaka and Howard Greenfield and was released in 1961 as a single by Sedaka. It was the title track of Sedaka's 1961 album Neil Sedaka Sings Little Devil and His Other Hits. It became a hit for him reaching #11 in the US Billboard Charts.

The personnel on the song included Al Caiola, Bucky Pizzarelli and Charles Macy on guitar, George Duvivier on bass, Phil Kraus on percussion, David "Panama" Francis on drums, Romeo Penque, Sol Schlinger and Herman Yorks on saxophone. Jack Keller and Ernie Hayes on piano, Harry Lookofsky, Julius Held, David Nadien, Paul Winter, Arnold Eidus and Julius Brand on violins.

Language versions

"Little Devil" was Sedaka's first song to be translated into Italian - "Esagerata". It was also translated into German ("Crazy Daisy"), Spanish ("Diablito") and in French by Les Gendarmes ("Petit Démon").

References

1961 singles
1961 songs
Neil Sedaka songs
Songs with lyrics by Howard Greenfield
Songs written by Neil Sedaka